Normal School for Colored Girls (now known as University of the District of Columbia) established in Washington, D.C., in 1851 as an institution of learning and training for young African-American women, especially to train teachers.

As Miner Normal School, it is listed on the National Register of Historic Places.

History

19th century
The school was founded by Myrtilla Miner in 1851, with the encouragement from Henry Ward Beecher and funding from a Quaker philanthropist  after the school in Mississippi where she taught refused her permission to conduct classes for African-American girls.  While inappropriate today, the use of the term "colored" was considered polite in 19th century speech. However, some sources refer to the school as the "Miner School for Girls".

Although the school offered primary schooling and classes in domestic skills, its emphasis from the outset was on training teachers. Miner stressed hygiene and nature study in addition to rigorous academic training.

Within 2 months of opening, school enrollment grew from 6 to 40.  Despite hostility from a portion of the community, the school prospered with the help of continued contributions from Quakers and a gift from Harriet Beecher Stowe (sister of Beecher) of $1,000 of the royalties she earned from Uncle Tom's Cabin.

As it grew, the school was forced to move three times in its first two years, but in 1854 it settled on a 3-acre (1.2-hectare) lot with house and barn on the edge of the city.  Around this time, Emily Edmonson enrolled in the school.  To help protect the school and those involved with it, the Edmonson family took up residence on the grounds and both Emily Edmonson and Myrtilla Miner learned to shoot. 

In 1856 the school came under the care of a board of trustees, among whom were Beecher and wealthy Quaker Johns Hopkins.  By 1858 six former students were teaching in schools of their own. By that time Miner's connection with the school had been lessened by her failing health, and from 1857 Emily Howland was in charge.

In 1860 the school had to be closed, and the next year Myrtilla Miner went to California in an attempt to regain her health. A carriage accident in 1864 ended that hope, and Miner died shortly after her return to Washington, D.C.

During the American Civil War, on March 3, 1863, the United States Senate granted the school a charter as the "Institution for the Education of Colored Youth" and named Henry Addison, John C. Underwood, George C. Abbott, William H. Channing, Nancy M. Johnson, and Myrtella Miner as directors.

From 1871 to 1876 the school was associated with Howard University. In 1879, as Miner Normal School, it became part of the District of Columbia public school system.

20th century
In 1929 an act of the U.S. Congress accredited it as Miner Teachers College.  Miner Teachers College and its predecessors were instrumental in the development of the black school system in the district between the 1890s and the 1950s, and held a virtual monopoly on teaching jobs in black schools during that time period.  Many graduates found jobs in black school districts in other parts of the country, expanding the influence of the Miner school outside the district.

In 1955 the school merged with Wilson Teachers College to form the District of Columbia Teachers College.  In 1976, after additional incorporations, the school was renamed University of the District of Columbia.

Building
The current Colonial Revival—Georgian Revival style building, built in 1913, was designed by Leon E. Dessez and Snowden Ashford.  The building is used for a broad range of community education programs, in addition to the teacher-training classes, which have been continuously offered there since it opened in 1914.

The building was listed on the National Register of Historic Places in 1991.

Notable people

Students
 Aloncita Johnson Flood, New York City official
Louise Daniel Hutchinson historian, attended the school.
 Ruby Hurley graduate, NAACP leader
 Dolores Kendrick, former Poet Laureate of the District of Columbia
 Alma Thomas, artist
 West A. Hamilton, military officer and D.C. school board member

Faculty and staff
 Martha B. Briggs, principal, 1879-1883
 Marguerite Williams, American geologist
 Otelia Cromwell, scholar
Hilda Rue Wilkinson Brown, teacher and alumni

See also
 
 National Register of Historic Places listings in the District of Columbia

References

External links
 Congressional records: Miner Teachers College

Defunct universities and colleges in Washington, D.C.
Historically black universities and colleges in the United States
Former women's universities and colleges in the United States
African-American history of Washington, D.C.
School buildings on the National Register of Historic Places in Washington, D.C.
Educational institutions established in 1851
Educational institutions disestablished in 1955
1851 establishments in Washington, D.C.
1955 disestablishments in Washington, D.C.
Howard University
University of the District of Columbia
Colonial Revival architecture in Washington, D.C.
Georgian Revival architecture in Washington, D.C.
Women in Washington, D.C.